Daniel Humm (born September 21, 1976) is a Swiss chef and restaurant owner; he is chef/owner of Eleven Madison Park.

His cuisine is focused on locally sourced ingredients, with an emphasis on simplicity, purity, and seasonal flavors. A native of Switzerland, he was exposed to a range of food at a very young age, and began working in kitchens at the age of 14. From there he spent time in some of the finest Swiss hotels and restaurants before earning his first Michelin star at the age of 24.

In 2003, Humm moved to the United States to become the executive chef at Campton Place in San Francisco where he received four stars from the San Francisco Chronicle. Three years later, he moved to New York to become the executive chef at Eleven Madison Park, and in 2011 he and his business partner Will Guidara purchased the restaurant from Danny Meyer's Union Square Hospitality Group. In 2017, Eleven Madison Park became number 1 on the World's 50 Best Restaurants.

Career
Over the course of Humm's tenure, he and Eleven Madison Park have received numerous accolades, including four stars from The New York Times, six James Beard Foundation Awards (including Outstanding Chef and Outstanding Restaurant in America), three stars from the Michelin Guide, and the #1 spot on The World's 50 Best Restaurants. In 2011, Humm and Will Guidara purchased Eleven Madison Park from Danny Meyer's Union Square Hospitality Group, and the following year also opened the critically acclaimed NoMad New York which garnered three stars from The New York Times, one Michelin Star, and a James Beard Foundation Award.  In 2018 Humm and Guidara opened NoMad Los Angeles, their first restaurant outside of New York City. Humm and Guidara parted ways in July 2019 and Humm announced in January 2020 that Make It Nice is no longer a partner with the NoMad group of hotels in New York, Los Angeles, or Las Vegas. 

In late 2019, Humm opened Davies and Brook, his first restaurant outside the US at London's historic Claridge's. He is the owner of the Make It Nice group and the author of four books: Eleven Madison Park: The Cookbook, I Love New York: Ingredients and Recipes, The NoMad Cookbook and Eleven Madison Park: The Next Chapter.

Humm is a co-founder of Rethink Food, a New York City-based nonprofit aimed at creating a more equitable, sustainable food system. When the COVID-19 pandemic led to Eleven Madison Park temporarily shutting down, Humm partnered with Rethink to keep a dozen chefs on staff, preparing and delivering meals to first responders and food-insecure communities throughout New York. At its peak, Eleven Madison Park was producing 3,000 meals a day to be served throughout underserved neighborhoods in The Bronx and Brooklyn.  

In October 2020, Humm launched Eleven Madison Home, a dine-at-home meal kit; each kit funded ten meals to food-insecure New Yorkers through Rethink Food. In April 2021, Humm and Rethink launched Eleven Madison Truck, a food truck to serve 2,000 meals a week in neighborhoods throughout the Bronx and Brooklyn, funded by diners at Eleven Madison Park. Each dinner purchased at the restaurant funds five free meals to food-insecure New Yorkers.

In November 2021, he left Claridges after they rejected his proposal for a vegan menu due to concern about the potential response from regular customers.

Awards
James Beard Foundation Awards 
 2016 James Beard Foundation Award – Outstanding Service, Eleven Madison Park 
 2014 James Beard Foundation Award – Outstanding Bar Program, NoMad New York
 2012 James Beard Foundation Award – Outstanding Chef
 2010 James Beard Foundation Award – Best Chef New York City
 2008 James Beard Foundation Award – Outstanding Wine Service, Eleven Madison Park
The World's 50 Best Restaurants
2018 The World's 50 Best Restaurants – Number 4, Eleven Madison Park 
2017 The World's 50 Best Restaurants – Number 1, Eleven Madison Park 
2016 The World's 50 Best Restaurants – Number 3, Eleven Madison Park 
2015 The World's 50 Best Restaurants – Number 5, Eleven Madison Park 
2015 The World's 50 Best Restaurants – Chef's Choice Award
2014 The World's 50 Best Restaurants – Number 4, Eleven Madison Park 
2013 The World's 50 Best Restaurants – Number 5, Eleven Madison Park 
2012 The World's 50 Best Restaurants – Number 10, Eleven Madison Park 
2011 The World's 50 Best Restaurants – Number 24, Eleven Madison Park  
2010 The World's 50 Best Restaurants – Number 50, Eleven Madison Park 
The World's 50 Best Bars 
 2017 The World's 50 Best Bars – Number 3, The NoMad Bar 
 2016 The World's 50 Best Bars – Number 8, The NoMad Bar 
 2015 The World's 50 Best Bars – Number 24, The Elephant Bar at NoMad New York
Michelin 
2018 Michelin Guide – Three Stars, Eleven Madison Park
2018 Michelin Guide – One Star, NoMad New York 
2017 Michelin Guide – Three Stars, Eleven Madison Park
2017 Michelin Guide – One Star, NoMad New York 
2016 Michelin Guide – Three Stars, Eleven Madison Park
2016 Michelin Guide – One Star, NoMad New York 
2015 Michelin Guide – Three Stars, Eleven Madison Park
2015 Michelin Guide – One Star, NoMad New York 
2014 Michelin Guide – Three Stars, Eleven Madison Park
2014 Michelin Guide – One Star, NoMad New York 
2013 Michelin Guide – Three Stars, Eleven Madison Park
2013 Michelin Guide – One Star, NoMad New York 
2012 Michelin Guide – Three Stars, Eleven Madison Park
2011 Michelin Guide – Three Stars, Eleven Madison Park 
2010 Michelin Guide – One Star, Eleven Madison Park
Additional Awards 
2016 Wall Street Journal – Innovator Awards
2015 The New York Times – Four Stars, Eleven Madison Park
2012 The New York Times  – Three Stars, NoMad New York 
2012 Crain's New York – 40 Under 40  
2010 Forbes Travel Guide – Five Stars, Eleven Madison Park
2009 The New York Times – Four Stars, Eleven Madison Park 
2005 Food & Wine –  Best New Chefs

Books
2017: Eleven Madison Park: The Next Chapter (Publisher: Ten Speed)
2015: The NoMad Cookbook (Publisher: Ten Speed)
2013: I Love New York: Ingredients and Recipes (Publisher: Ten Speed)
2011: Eleven Madison Park: The Cookbook (Publisher: Little Brown)

See also
List of Michelin starred restaurants

References

Living people
Swiss chefs
Head chefs of Michelin starred restaurants
1976 births
People from Zürich
James Beard Foundation Award winners